The Larry King Show is an American overnight radio talk show hosted by Larry King which was broadcast nationally over the Mutual Broadcasting System from January, 1978 to May, 1994. A typical program consisted of King interviewing a guest, then taking phone calls from listeners for the guest, and then taking phone calls on any topic. In 1982, the show won a Peabody Award.

Origin
In 1978, King went from hosting a local talk show on station WIOD in Miami, Florida to a national show, inheriting the nightly nationwide talk show slot on the Mutual Broadcasting System, that had previously been hosted by "Long John" Nebel and Candy Jones on the network and had been pioneered by Herb Jepko in 1975. The main reason King got the Mutual job is that he had once been an announcer at WGMA in Hollywood, Florida, which was then owned by C. Edward Little. Little went on to become president of Mutual and he hired King as Nebel's replacement. 
 
King's debut program on Mutual was broadcast from Miami on January 30, 1978, where his first guest was Miami Dolphins  coach Don Shula. After nine weeks production of the show moved to Mutual's main studios in Crystal City, Arlington, Virginia near Washington, D.C.  He started with 28 stations and rapidly developed a large and  devoted audience who became known as "King-aholics".  The show was initially "offered on a barter basis so stations could trade advertising time for the opportunity to carry the show", providing stations with a low cost overnight show.

Show format
Mutual broadcast the show live Monday through Friday from midnight to 5:30 a.m. Eastern Time. King would interview a guest for the first hour, with callers asking questions that continued the interview for another 2 hours. When he interviewed authors, King said that he would not read their books in advance, so that he would not know more about the book than his audience. King said "The less I know, the better I feel about a person or book."

King recalled that due to the number of calls coming in during the early days of the show "there was more than one occasion when [area code] 703 blew".  King said that he originally wanted a toll-free telephone number for call-in, but came to believe that he got a better quality of calls when the callers had to pay for them. The show was successful, starting with relatively few affiliates and eventually growing to more than 500, when King retired from the show in 1994. In 1985, King began appearing on television with the interview program Larry King Live for CNN; he continued to broadcast his Mutual radio show later in the evening.

During the 1980s, C-SPAN would annually record, and then repeatedly show, an entire broadcast of the Larry King Show on cable TV.  Some years, C-SPAN would simulcast the Mutual radio broadcast, so that TV viewers could watch the show live (as radio listeners normally heard it).

King said that his two most difficult interviews were Demond Wilson and Robert Mitchum.  Wilson apparently did not want to be there, and Mitchum gave one word answers, said King in a 1990 interview. Interviewee Rod McKuen offered to send a copy of his latest album to any listener who proved they bought the book by sending him the inside cover flap; he ended up receiving 289,000 flaps.  The show had attempted to book Ted Turner, when he did appear on the show he recruited King to come to CNN and do a show that would become Larry King Live.

At one point in the late 1980s, King's show was the most-listened-to talk radio program in America; it was supplanted by The Rush Limbaugh Show in 1991.

Open Phone America
At 3 a.m., King would allow callers to discuss any topic they chose with him, until the end of the program, when he expressed his own political opinions. That segment was called Open Phone America. Many stations in the western time zones would carry Open Phone America live, followed by the guest interview on tape delay.  Thus listeners from across the country could call into Open Phone America.  As the show became successful, King was able to favor stations which carried his whole show live, as when he switched his Los Angeles carrier to KMPC from the more powerful KFI.

Callers to the show would be told (on air) to call the number and "Let the connection ring. We'll answer when it's your turn." Some of King's regular callers used pseudonyms, or nicknames given by King such as "The Numbers Guy", "The (Syracuse) Chair", "The Portland Laugher", "the Whittier Whistler", "The Scandal Scooper", and "The Miami Derelict".

Humor
King would occasionally entertain his audience by telling amusing anecdotes from his youth and early career in radio, such as a story about when he and his friends faked the death of a schoolmate.  In another, King told of his misadventures trying to sell a baby walker.

King put future Hall-of-Fame pitcher Sandy Koufax into his popular Carvel ice cream story.  This was later proven to be untrue (Koufax stated that he didn't meet King until the late 1970s), as was another popular story where King, as a young disc jockey, left the radio station while on the air to romance a lady across town.  Regarding the spurious stories King later admitted "I should never have done that. I used to do it just to improve my own ego."  In his 2009 autobiography, King replaced Koufax in the Carvel story with "Howie Weiss".

The show also occasionally featured a "fictional alien, Gork of the planet Fringus", "a Brooklyn-accented intergalactic Donald Duck" "who supposedly existed [31 days] in the future, giving highlights of the coming  [month] on Earth".  Gork was voiced by King's long-time friend Herb Cohen.  During the early years of the program, King would occasionally play music featuring the "Mutual Symphony Orchestra".

Final year
King's primary guest host since the early 1980s had been Jim Bohannon, who began hosting his own Saturday evening call-in show on Mutual in 1985, with a format identical to King's program.  In 1993, in accordance with King's desire to reduce his workload, Mutual moved the Larry King Show to a shorter afternoon time slot and offered King's late evening time slot to Bohannon. Most radio stations with a talk show format at that time had an established policy of broadcasting local programming in the late afternoon time-slot (3 to 6 p.m. Eastern Time) that Mutual now offered King's program. As a result, many of King's overnight affiliates declined to carry the daytime show and it was unable to generate the same audience size. After sixteen  years on Mutual, King decided to resign from the program, with his final broadcast heard on May 27, 1994. Mutual gave King's afternoon time-slot to David Brenner; Brenner hosted his afternoon program until 1996. Mutual affiliates were given the option of carrying the audio of King's new CNN evening television program. Westwood One (owner of the Mutual Broadcasting System since 1985, retired the Mutual name in 1999) continued to air a radio simulcast of King's CNN show until December 31, 2009. Bohannon continued to host the late night slot until his abrupt retirement in October 2022.

The George Washington University, in Washington D.C., holds the archives of this show.

Sources

American talk radio programs
Peabody Award-winning radio programs
Mutual Broadcasting System programs
1970s American radio programs
1978 radio programme debuts
1980s American radio programs
1990s American radio programs
1994 radio programme endings